Evpaty Kolovrat (c.1200 – 1238) is a Russian bogatyr described in The Tale of the Destruction of Ryazan. According to the tale he died while fighting the vastly superior army of the Mongol ruler Batu Khan, trying to avenge the destruction of Ryazan a few weeks earlier.

Appearance in the Tale 

Kolovrat was visiting Chernigov at the time of the Siege of Ryazan, which occurred between 16 and 21 December 1237. Learning about the tragedy, he rushed back home, only to find the city destroyed and most its inhabitants killed. He gathered 1700 people from his soldiers and from the survivors of the siege and went after Batu Khan with a sole purpose of avenging the carnage. Kolovrat's forces suddenly attacked the rear-guard of Batu Khan's army and annihilated it in a fierce battle. Perplexed,  Batu Khan sent out a much larger force, led by his relative Khostovrul. Khostovrul promised to capture Kolovrat alive, and accordingly challenged Kolovrat to a duel. A man of extraordinary strength, Kolovrat split his opponent in half with his sword and proceeded to kill the surrounding Mongols, splitting many of them down to the saddle. Khostovrul's remaining soldiers retreated and killed Kolovrat from a distance using  stone launchers. In a sign of respect for Kolovrat's bravery, Batu Khan returned his body to his soldiers and let them return home.

Legacy
The bravery and strength of Kolovrat were praised in the Russian literature, art and media by 
Nikolay Yazykov in "Evpaty" (1824)
Lev Mei in the "Song about boyar Evpaty Kolovrat" (1859)
Sergei Yesenin in The Tale of Evpaty Kolovrat  (1912)
Vasily Yan in Chapter 3 "Evpaty the Fierce" of the book Batu (1942)
Furious (Kolovrat) film of Ivan Shuvkhovetsky (2017)
Evpatiy Kolovrat, an icebreaker for the Russian Navy
The tale of Kolovrat is depicted in the 1985 Soviet short animated film The Tale of Evpaty Kolovrat and is being produced as a full-length movie.

References 

Russian knights
1200 births
1238 deaths